Triarius was a Gothic nobleman and soldier. He was a member of the Amali dynasty. At least by the Battle of Nedao, Triarius had withdrawn his support from Valamir, who was his relative and the king of the Ostrogoths. Triarius joined the Eastern Roman army, where he rose to a prominent position. His sister was married to the powerful general Aspar. Triarius was the father of Theodoric Strabo. Triarius probably died in the 450s, and was succeeded by his son as leader of the Thracian Goths.

Sources
 

5th-century Ostrogothic people
Amali dynasty
5th-century Byzantine military personnel
Gothic warriors